Caldeira is a Portuguese surname. Notable people with the surname include:

 Alice Dayrell Caldeira Brant (1880–1970), Brazilian juvenile writer
 Amir Caldeira (born 1950), Brazilian physicist
 Bernard Anício Caldeira Duarte (born 1992), Brazilian footballer
 Darren Caldeira (born 1987), Indian footballer
 Kenneth Caldeira (born 1960), American atmospheric scientist
 Manuel Caldeira (born 1926), Portuguese footballer

See also 

 Caldera (disambiguation)

Portuguese-language surnames